Agyneta punctata is a species of sheet weaver found in Greece and Turkey. It was described by Wunderlich in 2005.

References

punctata
Spiders described in 2005
Spiders of Europe
Spiders of Asia